MOM: Music for Our Mother Ocean is a series of three compilations produced by Surfdog Records to benefit the Surfrider Foundation. The albums feature original songs as well as covers – many sharing a surfing or summer theme – by a range of popular artists.

Track listing

Reception
Entertainment Weeklys  Mike Flaherty gave Volume 1 a "B" rating. He called the compilation less sanctimonious than traditional benefit albums, noting the number of celebrity artists, and he singled-out Pearl Jam's cover of the "loopy" "Gremmie Out of Control" and Helmet's "ham-fisted" cover of "Army of Me". Marcus Greville of the Green Left Weekly stated that due to the inconsistent song styles the album was "appealing, but difficult to become engaged in". He gave the album 7/10, and recommended the album as a "gift for a surfer friend". David Yonke of the Toledo Blade called it "one of the most enjoyable compilation albums to be issued in a while", but noted that the "MOM" abbreviation should have been "MOMO".

Volume 2 received a "B−" from Entertainment Weeklys Steven Mirkin. He preferred the "freshness" of ska bands like 311 and Mighty Mighty Bosstones to the more surf rock-inspired tracks, calling the Beach Boys' "Summer in Paradise" "especially tired". He commended Dick Dale's "Misirlou '97" as being the only track to successfully bridge the old and new styles, and called Jewel's "V-12 Cadillac" "a loser, ecologically and musically."

In his review of Volume 3, Steve Crawford of the Houston Chronicle called the series both a "terrific product" due to the disparate musicians working to help the environment, and "tepid bathwater" due to many "halfhearted" tracks. He called the covers of "Little Deuce Coupe" from Brian Setzer, "Here Comes the Sun" from Allison Moorer and "Summer in the City" from the Butthole Surfers as "tame and routine".  He viewed some songs more favorably, calling Everclear's "Walk, Don't Run" "rip-roaring", and Sprung Monkey's "Coconut" "clever and bouncy". AllMusic's Stephen Thomas Erlewine gave the Surfrider Foundation credit for compiling exclusive "first-rate" tracks performed by major artists, but called the result a balance "between the good and the mediocre". He was the most positive about the "frazzled beach party song" "Electric Music and the Summer People" by Beck, the "strangely ambitious" "The Whale Song" from Pearl Jam, and the collaboration between Snoop Dogg & Rage Against the Machine, "Snoop Bounce". Also mentioned favorably were "Little Deuce Coupe" from Brian Setzer & Brian Wilson, "Walk, Don't Run" from Everclear "Winter Waves" from Chris Isaak, and the "fun punk throwaway" of the Beastie Boys' "Nothing to Say". Sprung Monkey's "Coconut" was mentioned as one of the few "trying moments", and he did point out that tracks from Paul McCartney and James Taylor had been previously released, but felt "the good intentions outweigh the end result". Ultimately he felt that the varied nature of the tracks would prevent listeners from enjoying the entire album, but that it was still more enjoyable than typical benefit albums.

References

1996 compilation albums
1997 compilation albums
1999 compilation albums
Charity albums
Surf music